Events in 1969 in Japanese television.

Debuts

Ongoing shows
Music Fair, music (1964-present)
Key Hunter, drama (1968–1973)

Endings

See also
1969 in anime
1969 in Japan
List of Japanese films of 1969

References